The One Love Party was a minor political party in the United Kingdom that identified itself as techno-progressive. The party campaigned for clean air and a federal union of the world. It was founded in 2015 and its first contest was in the 2016 London mayoral election.

The party was led and founded by Ankit Love, a musician and film maker. It was statutorily deregistered on 19 December 2017.

History 
The One Love Party was founded in Hackney, London by Ankit Love and his friend from Cambridge University, Finn Grant. The party was set up in a dormitory room at a youth hostel.

The One Love Party was registered with the Electoral Commission on 12 October 2015. In 2016, Pax Brown became the party's general-secretary.

In May 2016, Love stood in the London mayoral election and was the youngest candidate to do so. His campaign focussed on London's housing crisis and air pollution in the capital. Love, who was technically homeless during the campaign, claimed not to have spent more than "a couple of thousand" pounds on the campaign. Nevertheless, Love had almost twice as many Facebook followers as the campaign's frontrunners, Sadiq Khan (Labour) and Zac Goldsmith (Conservative). Love came last with 4,941 first preference votes (0.2%).

Love subsequently stood for the party in the Tooting by-election, which was called after Khan, the constituency's Member of Parliament (MP), was elected as Mayor of London. During the election campaign, Love released a rap video depicting a map in which the Indian state of Jammu and Kashmir is an independent country; such representations are illegal under Indian law. Love obtained 32 votes (0.1%), coming 10th out of 14 candidates.

On 15 September 2016, the party achieved its best electoral result by vote share: French artist Dawa Ma won 494 first-preference votes (1.5%) in the Hackney mayoral by-election, campaigning for a second referendum on the UK's membership in the European Union.

Love stood in the Batley and Spen by-election on 20 October 2016. Love wanted to unite Britain on the air pollution issue, claiming that it would kill 200,000 people in the UK over the next five years. He came last with 34 votes (0.2%).

Emilia Rose Arnò stood for the One Love Party in the Witney by-election, which took place on the same day as the Batley and Spen by-election. Arnò's campaign called for emergency action on air pollution and better youth enfranchisement. She came second to last with 44 votes (0.1%).

Love stood in the Richmond Park by-election on 1 December, using the title of Maharaja Jammu and Kashmir, with plans to reunite India and Pakistan, and end the potential for a nuclear war between the two countries, embroiled in 69 years of armed conflict in Kashmir. His vote total of 67 represented 0.1% of those voting. He came seventh out of eight candidates.

The One Love Party was statutorily deregistered with the Electoral Commission on 19 December 2017.

Policies 
The party described itself as "techno-progressive".

The party proposed legalising, licensing and taxing drugs such as cannabis in the hope of ending the war on drugs and reducing violent crime. Love claimed that the prohibition of drugs "was originally based on racism, and it funds all the criminal activity in our society." During the London mayoral campaign, it proposed to do this through municipality-owned licensed dispensaries.

The party called for a vote on the final Brexit deal, which would have enfranchised citizens of the European Union resident in the United Kingdom and 16- and 17-year-olds. Because EU citizens could not vote in it, the party claimed that the Brexit referendum was illegal, violating the Lisbon Treaty and the European Convention on Human Rights.

During the London mayoral election campaign, the party endorsed Terry Farrell's proposal to build six new bridges across the River Thames in order to boost the regeneration of East London and provide 47,000 homes. The party also pledged to introduce "discount travel cards for Londoners" and make higher education free for London residents up to PhD level.

During the Tooting by-election campaign, Love favoured bringing the Crossrail 2 line through Tooting Broadway and voiced his opposition to HS2.

Environment 
The One Love Party's priority issue was air pollution. It campaigned for immediate emergency action to bring fossil fuel emissions to zero by the Civil Contingencies Act 2004 and Royal Prerogative to force all power production, shipping, aviation and automobile companies to convert to only clean energy sources. The party pledged to ban all cars except electric and hydrogen vehicles.  Love had previously called for the army to organise a military coup d'état and overthrow David Cameron, then the Prime Minister, on the issue of air pollution.

During the London mayoral election campaign, the party called for a ban on all fossil fuel emissions vehicles from the capital. Love called for the city's cycle superhighways to be suspended from the railway network. The party would have converted all water vessels from bunker fuel to hydrogen fuel, solar or SkySails. The party also pledged to increase the use of driverless electric vehicles, reduce the cost of installing solar panels in residential homes, adopt electric and hydrogen-powered buses, scrap the Garden Bridge project, cancel the Silvertown tunnel project, revive the Thames' eel population and investigate the potential of new moorings. Love also called for adverts for cars to be banned in the same way as adverts for cigarettes. During the Hackney mayoral by-election campaign, the party called for a monument to remember the victims of air pollution akin to a war memorial.

Technology 
In agreement with its techno-progressive philosophy, the party supported the expansion of drones, driverless cars, robotic technology and artificial intelligence, stating that these would make more efficient use of scarce resources even if they increased unemployment.

The One Love Party believed in an accelerated program of space exploration, including the colonisation of Mars and Venus and the mining of asteroids to mitigate economic scarcity.

They had pledged to establish a London municipal space program to detect unknown asteroids on a collision course with Earth.

By applying robotic technology and artificial intelligence, the party wished to abolish personal income taxes and introduce a universal basic income for all citizens. During the London mayoral election campaign, the party pledged to introduce Li-Fi networks and use maintenance drones to oversee roadworks and street and building repairs. Love said that he wanted London to be the first major city "to have driverless cars on an everyday basis."

Electoral performance

Notes and references 
Notes

References

Defunct political parties in the United Kingdom
Political parties established in 2015
Civil liberties advocacy groups
Political parties disestablished in 2017
Progressive parties